Rod Brown (born 27 January 1964) is an Australian former soccer player. Brown earned seven caps, including two full international caps, for the Socceroos. Both those full international caps were against New Zealand in 1987.

Brown also played for several clubs in the National Soccer League. He scored the second goal in the Brisbane Strikers 2–0 win over Sydney United in the 1996-97 NSL Grand Final at Lang Park. When he retired he held the record for most NSL goals scored (137 goals).

He is the father of former Melbourne Victory and current player for Brisbane Roar Corey Brown.

References

Australian soccer players
Australia international soccer players
Marconi Stallions FC players
APIA Leichhardt FC players
Brisbane Strikers FC players
1964 births
Living people
Association football forwards
Newcastle Breakers FC players